George William Monk (September 10, 1838 – August 18, 1917) was a member of the Legislative Assembly of Ontario who represented the Ottawa area riding of Carleton from 1871 to 1894.

He was born in March Township, Ontario in 1838. He was educated in Bytown and Potsdam, New York.

Monk represented Carleton in the Ontario Legislative Assembly from 1871 to 1894 as a Conservative MLA. He was a deputy grandmaster of the Orange Lodge in British North America. He died in 1917.

References

 Historical Sketch of the County of Carleton (1971) - originally published in 1879, reprinted by Mika Press, Belleville, Ontario

External links 

 The Canadian parliamentary companion, 1891, J. Durie

1838 births
1917 deaths
Progressive Conservative Party of Ontario MPPs